Melangeia was a place in ancient Arcadia, northeast of the town Mantineia, on one of the roads to Argos. From Melangeia, an aqueduct led to Mantineia. 

Its location corresponds with that of the modern village Pikernis.

References

Populated places in ancient Arcadia
Former populated places in Greece